Melva is an extinct town in southern Taney County, in the Ozarks of southwest Missouri. The GNIS classifies it as a populated place. The site was located south of Hollister on the east bank of Turkey Creek along the Missouri Pacific Railroad. On March 11, 1920, the town was destroyed by a deadly tornado that killed 11 people, including 9 children. Some of the remains of Melva, mostly foundations of homes, remain on the site today.

A post office called Melva was established in 1906, and remained in operation until 1931. A railroad official gave the community the name of his daughter.

Gale Wade (1929-2022), baseball player, was born in Melva.

References

Ghost towns in Missouri
Former populated places in Taney County, Missouri